Aleksandra Kałucka (born 25 December 2001 in Tarnów) is a Polish sport climber. She participated at the 2022 IFSC Climbing European Championships, being awarded the silver medal in the women's speed event. Kałucka is the twin sister of Natalia Kałucka.

References

External links 

 

Living people
Polish rock climbers
21st-century Polish women
2001 births
Sportspeople from Tarnów
Twin sportspeople
Polish twins
Sport climbers at the 2018 Summer Youth Olympics
IFSC Climbing World Cup overall medalists
Speed climbers